Mixed Emotions may refer to:

Albums and EPs
 Mixed Emotions (Beverley Craven album), 1999
 Mixed Emotions (Exile album), 1978
 Mixed Emotions (Tanlines album), a 2012 album by Tanlines
 Mixed Emotions, a 2000 album by Bebe Barron
 Mixed Emotions, a 1977 album by Sammi Smith
 Mixed Emotions, a 2020 EP by Lauren Spencer-Smith

Bands
 Mixed Emotions (band), a German pop group
 The Mixed Emotions, a late 60s garage band from who appeared on Essential Pebbles, Volume 1

Songs
 "Mixed Emotions" (1951 song), written by Stuart F. Louchheim and performed by Rosemary Clooney
 "Mixed Emotions" (Rolling Stones song), 1989
 "Mixed Emotions", a 2021 song by Ladyhawke
 "Mixed Emotions", a 2022 single by Chase & Status